Leptecophylla parvifolia, commonly known as the mountain pinkberry, is a small to medium sized shrub within the Ericaceae family and is endemic to the highlands of Tasmania.  This species was first collected and documented in 1804 by Robert Brown and was formerly included in the Cythodes genus. It was then as noted as subspecies of Leptecophylla junipernia but in 2018, was classified as its own species

Habit  
It grows as an erect, compact, and rounded shrub, typically wider than it is high. This species typically ranges in height  from 50-150cm, rarely exceeding 2m. L. parvifolia is common in open eucalypt woodlands and within rainforest communities. It  occurs throughout the southern, central and northeast highlands of Tasmania at altitudes above 500 metres and can form the dominant shrub layer in some  locations (e.g. the Central Plateau). In the southeast, its primarily found on rocky dolerite slopes but also can occur on Carboniferous-Devonian rock types

Description 
The leaves of this species are small, hence  the name ‘parvifolia’ which translates roughly to ‘small leaves’. The leaves are alternately arranged and smaller than other Leptecophylla species, often  <7mm, dark green in colour and pungent. They are linear-lanceolate while the margins are slightly recurved, the apex of the leaves comes to a sharp point. The abaxial surface is pale white and waxy which displays a distinct  striate pattern. However, the venation is typically narrow palmate and gives the appearance of being parallel due to the curvature of the margins and small leaf size.

This species bares small, white, bell shaped flowers that are smaller than then that of the other species in this genus. It flowers from September to January and by late spring, has masses of small edible pink/red berries up to 8mm in diameter

References 

Ericales of Australia
Plants described in 2017
Flora of Tasmania
Epacridoideae